Long walls were ancient Greek defensive structures between cities and ports, especially the Long Walls linking Athens to Piraeus and Phalerum.

Long Wall may also refer to:
 Anastasian Wall
 Long Wall (Thracian Chersonese)
 Long Wall of China, officially known as the Great Wall
 Long Wall of Vietnam
 Long Wall of Korea, built by Goryeo
 Longwall mining, an underground mining technique

See also
 Grand Wall
 Great Wall (disambiguation)